The 2020 Summer Olympics women's basketball tournament in Tokyo, began on 26 July and ended on 8 August 2021. All games were played at the Saitama Super Arena in Saitama, Japan.

It was originally scheduled to be held in 2020, but on 24 March 2020, the Olympics were postponed to 2021 due to the COVID-19 pandemic. Because of this pandemic, the games were played behind closed doors.

The United States won the title for the ninth overall and seventh consecutive time by defeating Japan in the final, while France secured the bronze medal with a win over Serbia.

The medals for the competition were presented by Samira Asghari, IOC Member, Afghanistan, and the medalists' bouquets were presented by Andreas Zagklis, Secretary General of FIBA, Greece.

Format
The twelve teams were split in to three groups of four teams. The teams placed first and second in each group and the two best third-placed teams qualified for the quarter-finals. The eight teams were divided in a group D (best 4 teams) and a group E (remaining 4 teams). The quarter-final pairings were drawn on 2 August after the end of the group phase. After that, a knockout system was used.

Competition schedule

Qualification

</onlyinclude>

Squads

Each NOC was limited to one team per tournament. Each team had a roster of twelve players, one of which could be a naturalized player.

Draw
The draw was held at the FIBA Headquarters in Mies, Switzerland on 2 February 2021:

Seeding

Referees
The following 30 referees were selected for the tournament.

  Juan Fernández
  Leandro Lezcano
  Scott Beker
  James Boyer
  Ademira Zurapović
  Guilherme Locatelli
  Andreia Silva
  Matthew Kallio
  Maripier Malo
  Michael Weiland
  Yu Jung
  Maj Forsberg
  Yohan Rosso
  Ahmed Al-Shuwaili
  Manuel Mazzoni
  Takaki Kato
  Yevgeniy Mikheyev
  Mārtiņš Kozlovskis
  Rabah Noujaim
  Samir Abaakil
  Kingsley Ojeaburu
  Gizella Györgyi
  Ferdinand Pascual
  Luis Vázquez
  Aleksandar Glišić
  Luis Castillo
  Antonio Conde
  Yener Yılmaz
  Amy Bonner
  Steven Anderson

Preliminary round
All times are local (UTC+9).

In the preliminary round, teams receive 2 classification points for a win, 1 classification point for a loss, and 0 classification points for a forfeit.

Group A

Group B

Group C

Third-placed teams ranking

Knockout stage

Ranking
A draw after the preliminary round decided the pairings, where a seeded team played an unseeded team. The draw was held after the last group stage match on 2 August. Teams qualified were divided into two pots:

 Pot D comprised the three first-placed teams from the group phase, along with the best second-placed team.
 Pot E comprised the two remaining second-placed teams, along with the two best third-placed teams.

Draw principles:

 Each game pairing had one team from Pot D and one team from Pot E.
 Teams from the same group could not be drawn against each other in the quarterfinals.
 The second-placed team from Pot D could not be drawn against the third-placed teams from Pot E.

Bracket

Quarterfinals

Semifinals

Bronze medal game

Gold medal game

Final ranking

Statistics and awards

Statistical leaders

Players

Points

Rebounds

Assists

Blocks

Steals

Efficiency

Teams

Points

Rebounds

Assists

Blocks

Steals

Efficiency

Awards
The awards were announced on 8 August 2021.

See also
Basketball at the 2020 Summer Olympics – Men's tournament

References

External links
Official website

 
2020
Women's basketball
International women's basketball competitions hosted by Japan
2021 in women's basketball
Women's events at the 2020 Summer Olympics